The 1933 All-Big Ten Conference football team consists of American football players selected to the All-Big Ten Conference teams chosen by various selectors for the 1933 Big Ten Conference football season.

All Big-Ten selections

Ends
 Ted Petoskey, Michigan (AP-1; UP-1; NK-1)
 Frank Larson, Minnesota (AP-1; UP-1; NK-1)
 Edgar Manske, Northwestern (AP-2)
 Sid Gillman, Ohio State (AP-2)
 Willis Ward, Michigan (NK-2)
 Fink, Illinois (NK-2)

Tackles
 Whitey Wistert, Michigan (AP-1; UP-1; NK-1)
 Ted Rosequist, Ohio State (AP-2; UP-1)
 Dutch Fehring, Purdue (AP-1; NK-1)
 Thomas D. Austin, Michigan (AP-2)
 Conrad, Chicago (NK-2)
 Ungers, Purdue (NK-2)

Guards
 Zud Schammel, Iowa (AP-1; UP-1; NK-1)
 Joseph T. Gailus, Ohio State (AP-1; UP-1; NK1)
 Fritz Febel, Purdue (AP-2; NK-2)
 Albert Kawal, Northwestern (AP-2; NK-2)

Centers
 Chuck Bernard, Michigan (UP-1; NK-1)
 Thomas W. Moore, Iowa (AP-2)
 Oen, Minnesota (NK-2)

Quarterbacks
 Jack Beynon, Illinois (AP-2; UP-1; NK-2))
 Joe Laws, Iowa (AP-1; UP-1 [halfback])
 Paul Pardonner, Purdue (NK-1)

Halfbacks
 Pug Lund, Minnesota (AP-1; UP-1; NK-1)
 Herman Everhardus, Michigan (AP-1; NK-1 [fb])
 Jay Berwanger, Chicago (AP-2)
 James Carter, Purdue (AP-2)
 Dick Heekin, Ohio State (NK-2)
 Hecker, Purdue (NK-2)

Fullbacks
 Duane Purvis, Purdue (AP-1; UP-1; NK-1 [hb])
 Dick Crayne, Iowa (AP-2)
 Laws, Iowa (NK-2)

Key

AP = Associated Press, "selected by the Associated Press with the assistance of coaches, officials and critics, who saw every player in action this fall"

UP = United Press chosen by the conference coaches

NK = Noble Kizer, head coach at Purdue and member of the NEA Service All-America Committee

Bold = Consensus first-team selection of both the AP and UP

See also
1933 College Football All-America Team

References

1933 Big Ten Conference football season
All-Big Ten Conference football teams